Zardu  is a village in north-eastern Afghanistan. It is located in Khwahan District, Badakhshan province.

See also
Badakhshan Province

References

External links
Satellite map at Maplandia.com

Populated places in Khwahan District